Richard Reed Childress (born September 21, 1945 in Winston-Salem, North Carolina) is an American former race car driver in  NASCAR. As the owner of Richard Childress Racing (RCR), he became one of the wealthiest men in North Carolina. In 2004, he opened a vineyard in the Yadkin Valley AVA near Lexington. He was on the board of directors of the National Rifle Association. His grandsons Austin Dillon and Ty Dillon are NASCAR drivers.

Driving career

Childress's career in NASCAR started in 1969 when a drivers' strike at Talladega Superspeedway left NASCAR president William France Sr. looking for replacement drivers. By 1971, Childress was racing as an independent driver, using the number 96. He changed to number 3 in 1976 as a tribute to Junior Johnson. Although he never won as a driver, he nonetheless proved to be capable and consistent behind the wheel, registering six top-5 finishes, seventy-six top-10 finishes, and five Top 10 point finishes, with a career-best ranking of fifth in 1975. He did, however, win the unofficial invitational Metrolina 200 in 1974.

Ownership of Richard Childress Racing

He retired from driving in 1981 after Rod Osterlund sold his NASCAR team to J.D. Stacy, and Osterlund's driver Dale Earnhardt did not want to drive for Stacy. Childress, with recommendations from R. J. Reynolds Tobacco Company, chose to retire and put Earnhardt behind the wheel of his No. 3 car, complete with Wrangler Jeans sponsorship. That first alliance with Earnhardt lasted for a single season. Ricky Rudd was hired in 1982 and drove for two years, giving the Childress team its first career victory in June 1983 at Riverside. Earnhardt returned for the 1984 season, and together with Childress formed one of the most potent combinations in NASCAR history. Earnhardt won championships in 1986, 1987, 1990, 1991, 1993, and 1994. In the mid-1990s, Childress began expanding his racing team, fielding entries in the Busch Series and Craftsman Truck Series. They won the 1995 Craftsman Truck Series championship with driver Mike Skinner in the series's first season. Childress expanded to a two-car operation in the NASCAR Cup Series, with Skinner driving the No. 31. In the early 2000s he added a third car, No. 30, driven by Jeff Green.

Earnhardt was killed on the last lap of the 2001 Daytona 500. Childress promoted Busch driver Kevin Harvick to drive the renumbered No. 29. Harvick would win in only his third start, at the Atlanta Motor Speedway. With Harvick having won the Busch Series championship in 2001 and 2006, RCR became the first team in NASCAR history to win all three of NASCAR's national championship series. RCR also won the Busch Grand National Series Owner's Championships in 2003 with Kevin Harvick and Johnny Sauter and in 2007 with Scott Wimmer and Jeff Burton. RCR won the 2011 NASCAR Camping World Truck Series and the 2013 NASCAR Nationwide Series Championship, both with Childress's grandson Austin Dillon driving the No. 3.

Childress's current full-time drivers in the NASCAR Cup Series are:
 Austin Dillon No. 3
 Kyle Busch No. 8

His drivers in the Xfinity Series are:
 Sheldon Creed No. 2
 Austin Hill No. 21

Personal life

Richard Childress currently resides in northwestern Davidson County, North Carolina. The Richard Childress Racing Museum is located in nearby Welcome, along with numerous racing maintenance shops. The Childress Vineyards winery is located a few miles south of the museum in Lexington at the US 52/US 64 interchange. Childress remains active, attending fundraisers and supporting local candidates for office.  He also owns a home in Port Orange, Florida.

In 2008, Richard and his wife Judy established The Childress Institute for Pediatric Trauma with the mission to lead national efforts to reduce death and disability following injury to children less than 18 years old. The Childress Institute is focused on funding research and medical education throughout the U.S. to improve treatment, as well as raising public awareness.

Childress has a number of racers in his family. His son-in-law is RCR general manager Mike Dillon, long-time Nationwide Series driver who made one Sprint Cup start (1998 California 500) in an RCR car. Austin and Ty Dillon (sons of Mike, grandchildren of Richard) are NASCAR drivers.

In 2017 he was elevated from Second Vice President to First Vice President of the National Rifle Association, which in accordance with NRA tradition would mean he could have expected to serve as the organization's president from 2019 to 2021. However, in 2018 Oliver North was designated to take over as president.  In August 2019, amidst controversy surrounding payments being made by the NRA to a law firm, Childress stepped down from the board. 

Childress is also a member of the Board of Directors for Ammo Inc., which contributed 1 million rounds of ammunition to the Armed Forces of Ukraine during the 2022 Russian invasion of Ukraine.

Controversies

Alleged favoritism towards Earnhardt and Harvick
In the 1980s, RCR fielded only one car - the #3 of Dale Earnhardt, who won 6 of his 7 championships with the team. During the late 1980s and mid 1990s, RCR fielded a part-time #31 for research-and-development purposes. By the mid 1990s, the #31 became a full-time car with Mike Skinner driving. Although the team was fully sponsored by Lowe's, there were claims that RCR weren't putting as many resources into the #31 as they were into the #3, giving Earnhardt an insurmountable competition advantage over his teammate. On a number of occasions, Skinner came close to winning races in the Cup Series in the #31, but lost each time - a couple of times to his teammate. Skinner ultimately never won a Cup race.

During the 2003 Pontiac Excitement 400, there was a feud between RCR drivers Kevin Harvick and Jeff Green. In 2001, Green helped RCR start what eventually became the No. 27 Chevrolet team in the Cup series. Back then, the No. 27 was No. 30 and it was sponsored by AOL, with Green as the driver. Harvick and Green had a Busch Series rivalry, but rejected notions that they couldn't get along. During the race, Harvick wrecked Green with 128 laps to go, taking Green out of the race. An upset Green replied by confronting Harvick's crew chief Todd Berrier in the No. 29 pit stall, leading Richard Childress to restrain him. Green later said to the media, "It's tough to be teammates when it seems like there is only one car at RCR." Green was fired the next day by Childress, who said that change was needed after the relationship had gone awry.

Kyle Busch
Childress was involved in a physical altercation with fellow Camping World Truck Series owner and current driver Kyle Busch following the Truck race on June 4, 2011. Joey Coulter, driver of Childress's No. 22 Chevrolet Silverado, battled tightly for position with the No. 18 Toyota Tundra of Busch. Coulter would eventually hold off Busch, taking fifth place in the O'Reilly Auto Parts 250. Once the race had concluded, Busch purposely bumped into Coulter's truck on the cool-down lap. Childress reportedly approached Busch in the garage area, took off his jewelry and proceeded to punch Busch in the face. The fight was broken up and insults were exchanged before Childress put Busch in a headlock and hit him again.

Two days later, NASCAR fined Childress $150,000 and placed him on probation through the end of the year. Busch was not fined or disciplined. NASCAR President Mike Helton stated that..."[Busch] did nothing that would have warranted the actions of Richard Childress."

2010 New Hampshire controversy
In 2010 at the Sylvania 300, Clint Bowyer won the race in Childress's No. 33 Cheerios car. However, his car failed inspection twice for not meeting specifications. Two days later, NASCAR penalized Bowyer's team with a 6-week crew chief suspension, a 150-point deduction and a $150,000 fine for crew chief Shane Wilson. NASCAR executive Robin Pemberton said the only reason the win wasn't also taken away from Childress's team was that Mike Helton considered the team punished enough.

The penalty dropped Bowyer back to 12th in points, 185 points behind then championship leader Denny Hamlin. Childress appealed the decision, which reduced the suspension to four races and $100,000, but the 150-point deduction was upheld. The penalty eliminated any shot Bowyer had at the Cup series championship that year. Childress was pleased that the penalties had been reduced, claiming that chief appellate officer John Middlebrook was fair in the appeal.

Childress maintains that the car failed inspection because it had been damaged by a pushing truck that pushed the car into victory lane when it ran out of gas.

Tire deflations
Following the 2015 Auto Club 400, NASCAR officials received rumors that teams were purposely deflating their tires. Deflation of the tires provides more control and grip on the track. Officials confiscated the tires of several teams including the No. 31 Richard Childress Racing car driven by Ryan Newman. Two weeks later, NASCAR penalized Childress's team with a $125,000 fine and a six-race suspension for No. 31 crew chief Luke Lambert, and other key players. Newman was also stripped of 75 driver and owner points, which would have dropped him from eighth in the standings to 26th.

Childress and Newman appealed to the National Motorsports Appeal Panel, with their hearing scheduled for April 16. The panel slightly reduced the penalties: the $125,000 fine for Lambert was reduced to $75,000, and the point deduction was reduced to 50, but the suspensions were upheld. Childress then went to the Final Appeals Board, which upheld the revised penalties, leaving Lambert and key players suspended. Newman dropped from eighth to 18th in the standings as a result.

Awards
He was inducted into the Motorsports Hall of Fame of America in 2016.

Motorsports career results

NASCAR
(key) (Bold – Pole position awarded by qualifying time. Italics – Pole position earned by points standings or practice time. * – Most laps led.)

Grand National Series

Winston Cup Series

Daytona 500

See also
Childress Vineyards
List of celebrities who own wineries and vineyards

References

Further reading

External links

1945 births
Living people
NASCAR drivers
NASCAR team owners
People from Davidson County, North Carolina
Racing drivers from North Carolina
Sportspeople from Winston-Salem, North Carolina
Richard Childress Racing drivers
NASCAR Hall of Fame inductees